Grantsdale is an unincorporated community in Ravalli County, Montana, United States. The community had a post office until October 29, 1988; it retains its own ZIP code, 59835.

Initially called Skalkaho Creek, the town became Grantsdale in about 1888 after H. H. Grant, the town's founder.

References

Unincorporated communities in Ravalli County, Montana
Unincorporated communities in Montana